Frederick William Hall,  (21 February 1885 – 24 April 1915) was an Irish-Canadian recipient of the Victoria Cross, the highest and most prestigious award for gallantry in the face of the enemy that can be awarded to British and Commonwealth forces.

Life 
Hall was born in Kilkenny, Ireland on 21 February 1885. His father was a British Army soldier from London. Hall emigrated to Canada approximately 1910, and lived in Winnipeg, Manitoba.  He was 30 years old, and a Company Sergeant-Major in the 8th (Winnipeg Rifles) Battalion, Canadian Expeditionary Force during the First World War when he performed a deed for which he was awarded the Victoria Cross.

Victoria Cross
It was on the night of 24 April 1915 during the Second Battle of Ypres in Belgium that Hall discovered a number of men were missing. On the ridge above he could hear moans from the wounded men. Under cover of darkness, he went to the top of the ridge on two separate occasions and returned each time with a wounded man.

By nine o'clock on the morning of the 24th there were still men missing. In full daylight and under sustained and intense enemy fire, Hall, Cpl Payne and Pvt Rogerson crawled out toward the wounded. Payne and Rogerson were both wounded, but returned to the shelter of the front line. When a wounded man who was lying some 15 yards from the trench called for help, Company Sergeant-Major Hall endeavored to reach him in the face of very heavy enfilade fire by the enemy. He then made a second most gallant attempt, and was in the act of lifting up the wounded man to bring him in when he fell, mortally wounded in the head. The soldier he had attempted to help was also shot and killed.

Hall's name can be found on the Menin Gate Memorial to the Missing war memorial in Ypres, Belgium, honouring 56,000 troops from Britain, Australia, Canada and India whose final resting place in the Ypres salient is unknown.

Memorials
Frederick William Hall lived on Pine Street, in Winnipeg, Manitoba. In 1925, Pine Street was renamed Valour Road because three of Canada's Victoria Cross recipients resided on the same 700 block of that street: Frederick Hall, Leo Clarke and Robert Shankland.  It is believed to be the only street in the British Commonwealth to have three Victoria Cross recipients to live on it, let alone the same block.  A bronze plaque is mounted on a street lamp at the corner of Portage Avenue and Valour Road to tell the tale of these three men.

References

Further reading 
The Register of the Victoria Cross (1981, 1988 and 1997)

Scotland's Forgotten Valour (Graham Ross, 1995)
Ireland's VCs  (Dept of Economic Development, 1995)
VCs of the First World War - The Western Front 1915 (Peter F. Batchelor & Christopher Matson, 1999)
Monuments to Courage (David Harvey, 1999)
Irish Winners of the Victoria Cross (Richard Doherty & David Truesdale, 2000)
Sidney Allinson, Gordon Enright, Ian Clapham "On the Battlefields", From the archives of "Maclean's Magazine", Edited by Michael Benedict, Penguin Canada, 2002 , p. 98

External links
Frederick William Hall's digitized service file
 Legion Magazine article on Frederick William Hall
 

1885 births
1915 deaths
Canadian people of Anglo-Irish descent
Canadian World War I recipients of the Victoria Cross
Irish World War I recipients of the Victoria Cross
Irish emigrants to Canada (before 1923)
People from Kilkenny (city)
Canadian military personnel killed in World War I
Canadian Expeditionary Force soldiers
Cameronians soldiers
Canadian military personnel from Manitoba
People from Winnipeg
Canadian Army soldiers
Royal Winnipeg Rifles soldiers
Royal Winnipeg Rifles